Connelly Sadakabatu (born 11 June 1956) is a Solomon Islands politician.

He studied tropical agriculture at the Popondetta Agricultural College in Papua New Guinea, obtained a diploma in teaching agriculture at the University of Papua New Guinea in 1986, and then a master's degree in Agriculture at the University of Western Sydney in 1996. He worked as a public servant, most notably becoming head of school at the Solomon Islands College of Higher Education.

He was first elected to the National Parliament of Solomon Islands as Independent MP for North West Choiseul in the August 2010 general election. Prime Minister Danny Philip appointed him Minister for Agriculture and Livestock Development in his coalition government. In November 2011, he crossed the floor to the Opposition with several other MPs, helping it to bring down the Philip government through a motion of no confidence. The new Prime Minister, Gordon Darcy Lilo, returned Sadakabatu to the position he had held under Philip. In October 2012, in a Cabinet reshuffle, he was shifted to the position of Minister for Development, Planning and Aid Co-ordination.

References

1956 births
Living people
Members of the National Parliament of the Solomon Islands
Government ministers of the Solomon Islands
University of Papua New Guinea alumni